Juist is an island and municipality in the district of Aurich in Lower Saxony in Germany. The island is one of seven East Frisian Islands at the edge of the Lower Saxon Wadden Sea in the southern North Sea. It is located between Borkum Island (west), Memmert Island (southwest) and Norderney (east). There are two villages on the island: the main village Juist, and Loog. The island is separated from Norderney by the Norderneyer Seegatt.

Overview and geography

The tallest buildings on Juist that can be seen from the North Sea are the water tower and an old hotel. There is a lighthouse on the island, but it is not in use. At the western end of the island is the Billreef, a large sandbank where birds such as dunlins, grey plovers and knots rest during their migration. In the western part of the island, the beach and the dunes are eroded by the sea. The edge of the dunes moves about five metres south each winter. On the western third of the island is Lake Hammersee, a freshwater lake.

Juist is accessible by plane or daily ferry. FLN Frisia Luftverkehr operates planes between Norden and Juist. Most motor vehicles are prohibited on the island, with only the fire department, the German Red Cross and doctors allowed to use them. Island tractors require a special license, while most other transport is done by bike or horse-drawn carriage. It was reported by the Reuters news agency, on 24 September 2014, that an unmanned "parcelcopter" will commence delivery of urgent drugs and supplies to the island by DHL. It will be the first time an unmanned aircraft had been authorised to deliver goods in Europe and the first time that automated drones have been used to deliver medicines anywhere in the world. The flight at an altitude of 50 m and at a speed of up to 18 m/s will be automated but monitored in Norddeich.

Economy
Tourism is the main source of income for Juist's economy. Almost all the buildings on the island feature guestrooms, with several hotels and a youth hostel also on the island. There is an island partnership between Juist and Hiddensee in the Baltic Sea.

History
In the 17th and 18th centuries, Juist was cut in two parts by several storm tides (see St. Peter's Flood). Around the year 1770 people started to close the 2 km wide burst at the southern side by a dune dike. As recently as 1928 the northern side was repaired. By that time, the water in Lake Hammersee had turned from saltwater to freshwater. On September 9, 2001, Juist citizens voted for their mayor directly for the first time, with Karl-Josef Wederhake winning the election. He was re-elected in September 2006.

Notable people 
 Curt Bruns (1915–1945) was a war criminal who was executed for the murders of two American-Jewish POWs. He was one of the first Nazi war criminals to be executed in Allied-occupied Germany.
 Martin Luserke (1880–1968) founded Stiftung Schule am Meer in 1924 and Schule am Meer in 1925 on Juist.
 Ma Anand Sheela (1949-) lived in Juist after leaving Rajneeshpuram in Oregon.

References

 
East Frisian Islands
Towns and villages in East Frisia
Car-free zones in Europe
Aurich (district)
Islands of Lower Saxony